William Jardine may refer to:

 William Jardine (merchant), Scottish surgeon and merchant, one of the founders of Jardine, Matheson & Co.
 Sir William Jardine, 7th Baronet (1800–1874), Scottish naturalist
 William Marion Jardine (1879–1959),  U.S. Secretary of Agriculture (1925–1929),  U.S. Ambassador to Egypt (1930–1933)
 William Murray Jardine (born 1984), 24th Chief of Clan Jardine
 William Jardine, editor of the Farmer's Almanac

See also
William Jardine Smith, Australian writer